William Douglas de Amorim (born 15 December 1991) is a Brazilian professional footballer who plays as a winger.

Club career

Astra Giurgiu
On 6 November 2014, De Amorim scored his first goal in UEFA Europa League, netting in the 81st minute for a 1–1 home draw against Celtic Glasgow.

FCSB
On 13 August 2016, FCSB announced the signing of Amorim for an undisclosed fee, with the player agreeing to a five-year deal with a €10 million buyout clause.

Loan to Xanthi
On 21 January 2019, Xanthi officially announced the signing of William on a one-and-a-half-year loan. 

His first goal came in the 2019–20 season's opener, in a 2-1 away win against AEK Athens, on 25 August 2019.  On 29 September 2019, he scored in a 3-1 home win against Volos. 

On 5 December 2019, William scored in a 3-0 home win against Apollon Larissa for the second leg of the Greek Cup round of 32, which helped his team secure a place in round of 16.

Personal life
De Amorim moved to Romania when he was 18 years old, and on 27 May 2016 he obtained Romanian citizenship. He said he wants to represent Romania at international level.

He is a married man and a Christian.

Career statistics

Club

Honours

Club
Astra Giurgiu
 Liga I: 2015–16
 Cupa României: 2013–14
 Supercupa României: 2014, 2016

References

External links

Footballers from São Paulo (state)
1991 births
Living people
Naturalised citizens of Romania
Brazilian footballers
Association football midfielders
Liga I players
FC Astra Giurgiu players
FC Steaua București players
LPS HD Clinceni players
Süper Lig players
Kayserispor footballers
Cypriot First Division players
Apollon Limassol FC players
Brazilian expatriate footballers
Expatriate footballers in Cyprus
Brazilian expatriate sportspeople in Cyprus
Expatriate footballers in Romania
Brazilian expatriate sportspeople in Romania
Expatriate footballers in Turkey
Brazilian expatriate sportspeople in Turkey
Romanian people of Afro-Brazilian descent